Pavel Navageethan (born 17 January 1984) is an Indian actor and filmmaker who works in Tamil cinema.

Acting career
Pavel Navageethan's dream was to be a director, so he wrote scripts for films, but was unable to get producers. He then moved to acting debuting under his friend, Pa. Ranjith's Madras, where he played a henchman named Viji. His role in the film earned him the name Madras Viji. Pavel Navageethan later played roles in several other films (including Kuttram Kadithal, Magalir Mattum, Vada Chennai, and Peranbu) before turning director. He made his directorial debut with a mystery thriller V1, after the editor was able to get a producer for the film.

Filmography 
All films are in Tamil except where noted.

As actor

As director

As dubbing artist

References 

Tamil film directors
Film directors from Tamil Nadu
Indian male film actors
Living people
Male actors in Tamil cinema
21st-century Indian male actors
1985 births